The Franciscan Helmut Schlegel wrote texts of several hymns in German. With the music by various composers in the genre Neues Geistliches Lied, many of them appeared in the 2013 Catholic hymnal Gotteslob, and in other songbooks.

History 
Schlegel is a German Franciscan, Catholic priest, meditation instructor, author, librettist and songwriter. He led from 2007 to 2018 the centre for Christian meditation and spirituality of the Diocese of Limburg, based at the Heilig Kreuz church in Frankfurt-Bornheim. He wrote texts for more than 200 hymns, which inspired various composers to write music of the genre Neues Geistliches Lied. Many of the songs appeared in the 2013 Catholic hymnal Gotteslob, some in the common section, others in the Limburg regional section. They also became part of other hymnals and songbooks, such as Junges Gotteslob, the hymnal for young people, the 2013 choral songbook Die Träume hüten (Guarding the dreams), published by Dehm-Verlag, and the Freiburger Kinderchorbuch (children's choir book), commissioned by the Diocese of Freiburg and published by Carus-Verlag.

List of hymns 
The sortable list has the songs initially in the order of Gotteslob. The first column, the song's number in the hymnal, is followed by the beginning,  the composer, the year of composition, and notes.

Individual hymns

Jesus Christus, Menschensohn 
Schlegel wrote "" as a three-fold call to the Jesus, like the liturgical Kyrie, addressed as the Son of man. The first stanza requests enlightenment to see God face to face. The second stanza recalls that Jesus carried on the Cross what we suffer. The third stanza requests that Jesus, called ("gerufen") from grave and death, may be with us on life's steps ("Stufen").

The text was set to music by both Helmut Föller, a church musician responsible for the musical education of priests and pastoral workers at the Sankt Georgen Graduate School of Philosophy and Theology in Frankfurt, as by Joachim Raabe.

Der Tag bricht an 
Schlegel wrote "" (The day will break) as a free paraphrase of the Magnificat. With music by Johannes Schröder, it appeared in the collection for evensong, Auf dem Weg durch diese Nacht, published by Dehm Verlag.

References

External links 
 

German poems
Catholic hymns in German
Contemporary Christian songs
Neues Geistliches Lied
21st-century hymns in German